Hotel Dajti was a hotel near Rinia Park on Dëshmorët e Kombit Boulevard in central Tirana, Albania. Carrying the name of nearby Dajti Mountain, it was the primary center for international visitors and diplomats during Albania's socialist period; the guest rooms were bugged with microphones, and there was a sub-basement floor for listening staff. 

The hotel was built in the 1930s by the Italian architect Gherardo Bosio and the designer Gio Ponti. It was one of the first buildings constructed in the functionalist style in Albania. In 2002 it was listed as a protected cultural monument, and in 2009 it served as the venue for the Tirana International Contemporary Art Biennale.

Hotel Dajti was bought for 30 million euro by the Bank of Albania and is not currently functioning as a hotel.

Numerous other establishments now carry the name "Dajti," such as the Dajti Park Hotel, 6 km outside the city.

References

Hotels in Tirana
Hotels in Albania
Defunct hotels